Miss Lettie and Me is a 2002 American made-for-television drama film starring Mary Tyler Moore and Burt Reynolds.  It is based on Katherine Paterson's short story "Poor Little Innocent Lamb". The film premiered in TNT on December 8, 2002.

Plot

Cast
Mary Tyler Moore as Lettie Anderson
Holliston Coleman as Travis
Charlie Robinson as Isiah Griffin
Burt Reynolds as Samuel Madison
Irma P. Hall as Rose Griffin
Marguerite Hannah as Nadine
Laura-Shay Griffin as Miss Fleming
Jennifer Crumbley Bonder as Alison

Production
The film was shot in Griffin, Georgia.

Reception
Radio Times gave the film two stars out of five.

References

External links
 
 

2002 films
2002 television films
2002 drama films
Films shot in Georgia (U.S. state)
Films based on short fiction
TNT Network original films
Television films based on short fiction
American drama television films
2000s English-language films
2000s American films